Memphis Championship Wrestling (MCW) was a professional wrestling promotion run by Terry Golden, based in Memphis, Tennessee. The promotion's first event was on February 20, 2000, and it remained active until mid-2001. It was employed as a World Wrestling Federation (WWF) developmental territory.

History
Terry Golden originally opened his Memphis-based promotion as Kick-Ass Wrestling, and it was later renamed to Memphis Championship Wrestling (MCW).

During June 2001 after the World Wrestling Federation (WWF) purchased World Championship Wrestling (WCW), the WWF dropped MCW as their developmental territory. Wrestlers were either sent to other developmental territories or fired, but they had to perform in the remaining scheduled MCW shows per their contracts.

Unleashed
MCW's television show Unleashed! aired on WLMT-TV every Saturday morning at 11:00 am and early Sunday morning at 1:30 am. The show was hosted by Lance Russell, David Webb, David Jett, with Kevin Kelly also later hosting.

After the promotion closed, the MCW television show was made up of candid interviews with many of the departing talents. Later, these television shows were made up of old replays before it was eventually dropped by the television station.

Championships
MCW Southern Heavyweight Championship
MCW Southern Tag Team Championship
MCW Hardcore Championship
MCW Southern Light Heavyweight Championship

Alumni 

Joey Abs
American Dragon
 The Blue Meanie
Steve Bradley
Bradshaw
Lance Cade
Bo Dupp
Jack Dupp
Ekmo
 Faarooq
 Pete Gas
Charlie Haas
Russ Haas
Kevin Kelly
Kimo
 K-Krush|R-Truth
 Jerry Lawler
 Joey Matthews
Jim Neidhart
 Bull Pain
 Lord Steven Regal
 Rodrageous
 Lance Russell
 Seven
 Spanky
Victoria
Christian York
The Kat
Thrasher
Scott Vick
Tracy Smothers
Viscera
Bobby Eaton
Faarooq
Molly Holly
Stevie Richards
Spike Dudley
Scotty 2 Hotty
Brian Christopher
Raven
Jerry Lynn
Ivory
Dustin Diamond
Sid Vicious
Motley Cruz
Doctor Bud
Seven
Ken Giddens
Jeff Droke
Ron Rage
Randall Collins
Tyler Gates
Chris Rocker
Hollywood Little
Bitty Little
Ref. Mike Darby

Tag Teams
The APA (Faarooq & Bradshaw)
The Dupps (Bo & Jack Dupp)
Haas Brothers (Russ & Charlie)
The Island Boyz (Ekmo & Kimo)
Joey Matthews & Christian York
The Mean Street Posse (Joey Abs, Pete Gas & Rodney)
The New Foundation (Blue Meanie & Jim Neidhart)

See also

List of independent wrestling promotions in the United States

References

External links
Memphis Wrestling
Memphis Wrestling History
Memphis Wrestling Yahoo Group

Independent professional wrestling promotions based in Tennessee
2000 establishments in Tennessee